Anthony Samuel Lane (May 2, 1944 – January 1, 2016) began his career as an assistant to Alexey Brodovitch at Harper's Bazaar, and became an early art director for Rolling Stone magazine. He was the designer of iconic album covers for Simon & Garfunkel (Bridge Over Troubled Water), Michael Jackson (Bad), and Creedence Clearwater Revival (Mardi Gras). His cover for Carly Simon's Boys in the Trees earned him a Grammy Award. He provided art direction for major record labels Columbia, Fantasy and Elektra, and developed branding for Pacific Telesis, LaCroix Sparkling Water, Wrangler and Kia. For two issues he was art director of Gnosis magazine.

Lane died of brain cancer on New Year's Day, 2016 in Oakland, California.

References

American graphic designers
1944 births
2016 deaths
Deaths from brain cancer in the United States
Deaths from cancer in California